Catherine Lucy Wilhelmina Powlett, Duchess of Cleveland (née Stanhope; 1 June 1819 – 18 May 1901), also known as Lady Dalmeny and Lady Harry Vane, was an English historian and genealogist, best known for her 1889 work The Battle Abbey Roll with some Account of the Norman Lineages.

Biography
Lady Wilhelmina Stanhope was the third child and only daughter of Philip Henry Stanhope, 4th Earl Stanhope (1781-1855), FRS, and his wife, Hon. Catherine Lucy Smith, daughter of Robert Smith, 1st Baron Carrington. Her first name was Catherine, but she was known by one of her middle names in order to distinguish her from her mother.

She was the mother of Archibald Primrose, 5th Earl of Rosebery, who was Queen Victoria's prime minister for 15 months from March 1894. In 1837 at the time of Victoria's accession, Lady Wilhelmina was reputedly the most beautiful woman at court. She was a Maid of Honour at the Queen's coronation, and served as a bridesmaid at her wedding to Prince Albert.

List of works
Her historical works included:
The Battle Abbey Roll with some Account of the Norman Lineages, 3 volumes, London, 1889. It consists of short histories concerning the origins of several hundred English families of Norman origin, based on names supposedly contained in the legendary Battle Abbey Roll:
Vol.1, London, 1889
Vol.2, London, 1889
Vol.3, London, 1889
See online text of all three volumes, with index, at:  
The True Story of Kaspar Hauser from Official Documents, London, 1893. Concerns her father's patronage of the "foundling" or  "feral child" Kaspar Hauser, a youth who had appeared in Nuremberg in 1828 and had become famous through his claim to have been raised in total isolation in a dark room and could tell nothing about his identity.
The Life and Letters of Lady Hester Stanhope, 1914. Concerns her father's half-sister Lady Hester Stanhope (1776–1839) a traveler and Arabist who died unmarried at the age of 63 in Syria

Marriages and progeny
Wilhelmina married twice, firstly in October 1843 to Archibald Primrose, Lord Dalmeny (1809-1851), eldest son of Archibald Primrose, 4th Earl of Rosebery (1783-1868), whom she met three months before at a ball at Buckingham Palace. They had two sons and two daughters before Dalmeny's early death to heart failure. Their eldest son, also named Archibald, inherited the earldom and went on to become prime minister.
 Lady Constance Evelyn Primrose (died 27 June 1939); married Henry Wyndham, 2nd Baron Leconfield, and had issue.
 Lady Mary Catherine Constance Primrose (circa 1845 – 3 September 1935); married Henry Walter Hope and had issue.
 Archibald Philip Primrose, 5th Earl of Rosebery (7 May 1847 – 21 May 1929)
 Everard Henry Primrose (8 September 1848 – 9 April 1885); died unmarried.

She was married secondly in 1854 to Lord Harry Vane (1803–1891), youngest son of William Vane, 1st Duke of Cleveland (1766-1842); he succeeded his brother in the dukedom in 1864, and changed his surname to Powlett. They had no children, and on Cleveland's death all his titles became extinct, with the exception of the barony of Barnard.

References

1819 births
1901 deaths
19th-century English historians
20th-century English historians
19th-century English women writers
20th-century English women writers
British women historians
English genealogists
Daughters of British earls
British duchesses by marriage
Dalmeny
Parents of prime ministers of the United Kingdom
Wilhelmina
Kaspar Hauser